Alexandre Bandzeladze  was a Georgian and Soviet artist.

Alexander Bandzeladze was born on 27 February 1927 in Tuluni, Irkutsk region, Russia. Alexandre Bandzeladze's family, after having been exiled to the Irkutsk District during the repressions in the 1920s, returned to Tbilisi in 1932. In 1947, he enrolled in the Oil Painting Department of the Tbilisi Academy of Fine Arts under the tutorship of Sergo Kobuladze, Iosif Charlemagne, and Valentin Sherpilov. Expelled from the academy in 1949, he received his diploma as late as 1963, with the help of Apolon Kutateladze. At that time, Bandzeladze actively collaborated with the editorial teams of various Georgian magazines. He authored milestone works for the development of Georgian book graphic design, such as Arsenas Leksi (Arsena's Poem) (1957) and Rudyard Kipling's Mowgli (1960).

In the 1950s, Alexandre Bandzeladze led an innovative movement in Georgia and the Soviet Union in general and pioneered the process of rejuvenating the language of visual arts. During his creative quest, and as a result of taking in the traditions of modernist European oil painting, he developed his own artistic system characterized by striking individualism. After Davit Kakabadze, Alexandre Bandzeladze was one of the first to have returned abstract art into Georgia's artistic context.

Alexandre Bandzeladze's works have had an enormous impact on the development of contemporary Georgian visual arts and on nourishing interest in arts among younger generations.

Exhibitions 

Solo exhibitions
1991 "Dissident “, Sevikli, Pennsylvania, USA
1991 Georgian Abstractions, Nicholas Rerikh Museum, New York - New York, USA
1990 "Where am I...?", Amsterdam, Netherlands
1989 Sevikli, Pennsylvania, USA
1988 Basel, Brussels, Belgium
1968 Opava, Czech Republic

Group Exhibitions
2000 - N Gallery, Tbilisi, Georgia
1992 - Mapini Art - Gallery, Sheffield, England
1991 - "Georgian Abstraction", "international image" Gallery, Pittsburgh, USA
1990 - "In the expression of watercolor," Tbilisi, Georgia
1990 - Four Design from Tbilisi, prideritsianis Museum, Kassel exhibition of abstract art. Cinema House, Moscow, Russia
1990 - "Georgia, My Love," Dumas kunst hale, Cologne, Germany

Georgian Art 1990, Mona Bismarck Foundation for International Art Exhibition House, Paris, France
1989 - "International image" Gallery, Pittsburgh, USA
1989 - Oriental Wave "Red - White," the Association "palette." Warsaw, Poland
1989 - 1920–1980 - ies of the Soviet Association palitra "Paris, beloruseti
1989 - Budenshati Gallery, Basel, Switzerland
1989 - 1970–1980 years of the Soviet Russian avant-garde, the association "palette" Moscow, Russia
1988 - Exhibition of Soviet Artists Gallery bosmanis, Brussels, Belgium
1987 - Hermitage Exhibition Hall, St. Petersburg, Russia
1987 - House of Artists. Tbilisi, Georgia
1986 - House of Artists, Tbilisi, Georgia
1972 - Museum of Fine Arts, Tbilisi
1966 - International Graphic Art Biennale, Brno, Czech Republic
1959 - Brussels, Belgium
1959 - Riga, Latvia, Lithuania
1957 - Museum of Fine Arts, Tbilisi, Georgia
1957- Manege, Moscow, Russia
1954 - Art Museum of Azerbaijan, Baku, Azerbaijan
1953 - Museum of Fine Arts, Tbilisi, Georgia
1949 - National Gallery of images, Tbilisi, Georgia
1949 - National Gallery of images, Tbilisi, Georgia

Details taken from the Georgian Art Portal.

References

Artists from Georgia (country)
Year of birth missing
Year of death missing